Trenholm may refer to:

People 
 Trenholm (surname), including a list of persons with the surname

Places 
Fort Trenholm, a historic (1864) artillery battery located at Johns Island, Charleston, South Carolina
Trenholm, Virginia, an unincorporated community in Powhatan County
Trenholm, one of two islands comprising Cape Jourimain
Trenholm Point, an ice-covered point northwest of Eldred Point on the coast of Marie Byrd Land